
Year 72 BC was a year of the pre-Julian Roman calendar. At the time it was known as the Year of the Consulship of Publicola and Lentulus (or, less frequently, year 682 Ab urbe condita). The denomination 72 BC for this year has been used since the early medieval period, when the Anno Domini calendar era became the prevalent method in Europe for naming years

Events 
 By place 

 Roman Republic 
 Third Servile War: Spartacus moves with his followers northward to the Po Valley. Roman forces under Lucius Gellius Publicola defeat a group of slaves (30,000 men) led by Crixus near Mount Gargano. He kills two-thirds of the rebels, including Crixus himself.
 Summer – Spartacus and his followers defeat the Roman forces under Gnaeus  Cornelius Lentulus Clodianus and Gellius, forcing the Roman legions to retreat in disarray. Both consuls are recalled to Rome in disgrace and relieved of their duties.
 Spartacus moves north again, to cross the Alps into Gaul and then to Thracia. Outside Mutina on the plain of the River Po he defeats the Roman forces under Gaius Cassius Longinus, governor of Gallia Cisalpina.
 Autumn – Spartacus and his followers withdraw to the Bruttium peninsula. At one juncture he contemplates attacking Rome – but moves south. The Senate sends Marcus Licinius Crassus against Spartacus.
 Winter – Spartacus decides to camp near Thurii. Marcus Licinius Crassus with 10 Roman legions tries to trap the rebels in the toe of Italy. He builds a trench and a low earth rampart (with a fortified palisade).
 Battle of Cabira: Lucius Lucullus defeats King Mithridates VI and overruns Pontus. Mithridates flees to Armenia, ruled by his son-in-law Tigranes, who refuses to turn his father-in-law in to Lucius Lucullus.
 Quintus Sertorius is assassinated by his subordinate, Marcus Perperna Vento, who is in turn defeated by Gnaeus Pompeius, thus ending the Sertorian War in Spain.

 Europe 
 The Suebi and other tribes under King Ariovistus invade Gaul.

Deaths 
 Crixus, Gaulish gladiator and military leader
 Marcus Perperna Vento, Roman statesman

References